The Southern States Wrestling (SSW) Tag Team Championship is a professional wrestling tag team championship in Southern States Wrestling. It was first won by Danny and Bam Bam Christian when they defeated The Russian Assassins in Hampton, Tennessee on October 1, 1990. The title is generally defended in the Southern United States, most often in its home base in East Tennessee, but has been defended in other parts of the country as well. While touring New England in late-1996, the titles changed hands when Scott Sterling & Dan Cooley lost the belts to Justin St. John & Steve Flynn in Revere, Massachusetts on November 23, 1996. There are 30 recognized known teams with a total of 65 title reigns.

Title history

Combined reigns 

{| class="wikitable sortable" style="text-align: center"
!Rank
!Team
!No. ofreigns
!Combineddays
|-
!1
| Death & Destruction || 8 || 578
|-
!2
| Death Riders || 5 || 526
|-
!3
| Wayne Rogers and George Hiatt || 1 || 517
|-
!4
|style="background-color:#FFE6BD"| Shawn Cruz and The Mega Destroyer † || 1 || +
|-
!5
| The Blond Bombers || 2 || 410
|-
!6
| The Batten Twins || 3 || 323
|-
!7
| Steve Flynn and K. C. Thunder || 2 || 298
|-
!8
| Legends || 4 ||style="background-color:#bbeeff| 278-309¤
|-
!9
| The Brooklyn Bad Boys || 1 || 267
|-
!10
| The Young Guns || 3 || 266
|-
!11
| Super Destroyer and Josh Cody || 2 || 235
|-
!12
| The Christian Brothers || 4 || 215
|-
!13
| KMF Inc. || 1 || 202
|-
!14
| Ricky Harrison and Iron Cross  || 1 || 188
|-
!15
| Scott Sterling and Dan Cooley || 2 || 184
|-
!16
| Robbie Cassidy and Tony Givens || 4 || 180
|-
!17
| Beau James and The War Machine || 2 || 147
|-
!18
| Chris Richards and Wayne Adkins || 1 || 141
|-
!19
| The Regulators || 1 || 124
|-
!20
| Beau James and The Hornet || 1 || 119
|-
!21
| Something Else || 1 ||style="background-color:#bbeeff| 87-118¤
|-
!22
| Beau James and Brian Overbay || 2 || 76
|-
!23
| The Rock 'n' Roll Express || 1 || 72
|-
!24
| Mike Powers and Alabama Heartthrob || 1 || 70
|-
!25
| The High Flyers || 1 || 63
|-
!26
| Scotty McKeever and Jesse Taylor || 1 || 58
|-
!27
| Danny Christian and Johnny Thunder || 1 || 49
|-
!rowspan=3|28
| Adam York and Thorn || 1 || 42
|-
| Beautiful Blonds || 1 || 42
|-
| Steve Flynn and Bobby B. || 1 || 42
|-
!31
| Justin St. John and Steve Flynn || 1 || 41
|-
!rowspan=2|32
| Beau James and Buddy Landel || 1 || 36
|-
| Nick Hammonds and Wayne Adkins || 1 || 36
|-
!34
| The Fantastic Express || 1 || 35
|-
!35
| Danny Christian and Eddie Bruiser || 2 || 31
|-
!36
| Jowad Wayne and Wayne Adkins || 1 || 29
|-
!37
| Beau James and Ricky Morton || 1 || 27
|-
!38
| Alex Shane and Eddie Golden || 1 || 22
|-
!39
| G.Q. Stratus and Jimmy Golden || 1 || 17
|-
!rowspan=3|40
| Beau James and Super Destroyer || 1 || 14
|-
| Chuck Jones and Roger Ham || 1 || 14
|-
| Mike Cooper and Super Masked Man || 1 || 14
|-
!43
| Ricky Morton and Wayne Adkins || 1 || 8
|-
!44
| Beau James and Dan Cooley || 1 || 1

By wrestler 
{|class="wikitable sortable" style="text-align: center"
!Rank
!Wrestler
!data-sort-type="number"|No. ofreigns
!data-sort-type="number"|Combineddays	
|-
!1
| Beau James || 13 ||style="background-color:#bbeeff| 636-667¤
|-
!rowspan=2|2
| Frank Parker || 8 || 578
|-
| Roger Anderson || 8 || 578
|-
!4
| K. C. Thunder || 6 ||style="background-color:#bbeeff| 576-607¤
|-
!rowspan=2|5
| Chic White || 5 || 526
|-
| Tennessee Equalizer || 5 || 526
|-
!rowspan=2|7
| Wayne Rogers || 1 || 517
|-
| George Hiatt || 1 || 517
|-
!rowspan=2|9
|style="background-color:#FFE6BD"| Shawn Cruz † || 1 || +
|-
|style="background-color:#FFE6BD"| The Mega Destroyer † || 1 || +
|-
!11
| Thorn Baldwin/Thorn || 3 || 452
|-
!12
| Scott Sterling || 5 || 450
|-
!13
| Tim Baldwin || 2 || 410
|-
!14
| Steve Flynn || 4 || 381
|-
!15
| Chris Richards || 2 || 343
|-
!rowspan=2|16
| Bart Batten || 3 || 323
|-
| Brad Batten || 3 || 323
|-
!18
| Danny Christian || 7 || 295
|-
!rowspan=2|19
| Brooklyn Bad Boy #1 || 1 || 267
|-
| Brooklyn Bad Boy #2 || 1 || 267
|-
!21
| Jeff Lovin || 3 || 266
|-
!22
| Super Destroyer || 3 || 264
|-
!23
| Ricky Harrison || 2 || 260
|-
!24
| Josh Cody || 2 || 235
|-
!25
| Bam Bam Christian || 4 || 215
|-
!26
| Wayne Adkins || 4 || 214
|-
!27
| Steve Fury || 1 || 202
|-
!28
| Iron Cross || 2 ||style="background-color:#bbeeff| 188¤
|-
!29
| Dan Cooley || 3 || 185
|-
!rowspan=2|30
| Robbie Cassidy || 4 || 180
|-
| Tony Givens || 4 || 180
|-
!32
| The War Machine || 2 || 147
|-
!33
| Ricky Morton || 4 || 142
|-
!rowspan=2|34
| Stone || 1 || 124
|-
| Steel || 1 || 124
|-
!36
| The Hornet || 1 || 119
|-
!rowspan=2|37
| John Noble || 2 ||style="background-color:#bbeeff| >87-118¤
|-
| Eddie Browning || 1 ||style="background-color:#bbeeff| 87-118¤
|-
!39
| Brian Overbay || 2 || 76
|-
!rowspan=2|40
| Mike Powers || 1 || 70
|-
| Alabama Heartthrob || 1 || 70
|-
!42
| Eddie Golden || 2 || 64
|-
!rowspan=2|43
| Andy Douglas || 1 || 63
|-
| Kelly Charles || 1 || 63
|-
!rowspan=2|45
| Scotty McKeever || 1 || 58
|-
| Jesse Taylor || 1 || 58
|-
!47
| Johnny Thunder || 1 || 49
|-
!rowspan=3|48
| Adam York || 1 || 42
|-
| Bobby B. || 1 || 42
|-
| Stan Lee || 1 || 42
|-
!51
| Justin St. John || 1 || 41
|-
!rowspan=2|52
| Nick Hammonds || 2 ||style="background-color:#bbeeff| 36¤
|-
| Buddy Landel || 1 || 36
|-
!54
| Bobby Fulton || 1 || 35
|-
!55
| Eddie Bruiser || 2 || 31
|-
!56
| Jowad Wayne || 1 || 29
|-
!57
| Alex Shane || 1 || 22
|-
!rowspan=2|58
| G.Q. Stratus || 1 || 17
|-
| Jimmy Golden || 1 || 17
|-
!rowspan=4|60
| Chuck Jones || 1 || 14
|-
| Mike Cooper || 1 || 14
|-
| Roger Ham || 1 || 14
|-
| Super Masked Man || 1 || 14
|-
!rowspan=5|64
| Bulldog Mac || 1 ||style="background-color:#bbeeff| N/A¤
|-
| Earl Fields || 1 ||style="background-color:#bbeeff| N/A¤
|-
| Jake Booth || 1 ||style="background-color:#bbeeff| N/A¤
|-
| Moe Jenkins || 1 ||style="background-color:#bbeeff| N/A¤
|-
| Ray Idol || 1 ||style="background-color:#bbeeff| N/A¤

References

External links
Official Tag Team Championship Title History
    SSW Tag Team Championship
Regional professional wrestling championships